Kaelyn Behr, known professionally as Styalz Fuego, is an Australian music producer, songwriter, vocalist and artist based in Melbourne. Styalz is renowned for his diverse production and songwriting, and most known for his eclectic take on hip-hop, electronic, R&B and K-Pop.

Styalz's accomplishments include the 2017 ARIA Song of the Year, 2012 ARIA Producer of the Year, 2013 APRA Breakthrough Songwriter Award and 2016 and 2018 APRA Most Played Australian Work awards and integral involvement in many multi-platinum, ARIA award-winning projects across his career in Australia, UK, USA and South Korea.

He has been based in Melbourne, Australia since 2003.

Early career 
Fuego was born in San Francisco Bay, California.  In 2007, Styalz produced Chamillionaire’s hit "Not a Criminal" featuring Kelis, which received negative reviews for its lacklustre lyrics and a pointless Kelis cameo. Around this time, he also began to remix a number of songs for artists including Sneaky Sound System, Savage, and Chris Lilley’s Summer Heights High character Mr. G.

Career 
In 2013, Fuego co-wrote the song "Astronaut" for UK singer/songwriter Joel Compass, which was added to BBC 1.

Styalz was involved in a string of multi-platinum singles from Peking Duk including the 2017 ARIA Song of The Year and 3× Platinum Stranger with Elliphant, the 4× Platinum single Take Me Over with Safia and Platinum Let You Down with Icona Pop. Styalz also co-produced Bliss n Eso's 2× Platinum single Moments with Gavin James, The Aston Shuffle's Gold single Tear It Down, Seth Sentry's Gold album This Was Tomorrow and Drapht's ARIA Award-winning Seven Mirrors album.

Styalz has seen an array of international releases, including the “Most Tweeted About Song of 2017” Korean supergroup EXO's smash single Kokobop, which propelled EXO's album The War to #1 in 41 countries on iTunes and now sits at over 1.5 million sales, including a Korean record 800,000 physical pre-orders. Through his other work in South Korea, Styalz also co-produced tracks for K-Pop royalty in EXO-CBX, Nu’Est, TVXQ and Henry Lau.

Styalz also worked on Ride or Die for The Knocks & Foster The People, Phases for ALMA and French Montana, Momma Always Told Me for G-Eazy, Certified for Wiley and co-produced numerous Destructo singles with Ty Dolla $ign, Pusha T, E-40, Too Short, ILoveMakonnen and Starrah.

Vocals 

In October 2013, Fuego's first official credit as a vocalist - under his given name Kaelyn Behr on the Thomas Gold collaboration "Remember" from Axwell's Axtone label - premiered on Danny Howard's BBC Radio 1 Show

Awards 

 2012 ARIA Producer of the Year
 2013 APRA Breakthrough Songwriter
 2015 ARIA Urban Release of The Year (Seth Sentry - Strange New Past)
 2016 APRA Most Played Australian Work (Peking Duk - 'Take Me Over’)
 2016 APRA Dance Release of The Year (Peking Duk - 'Take Me Over’)
 2016 ARIA Urban Release of The Year (Drapht - Seven Mirrors)
 2017 ARIA Song Of The Year (Peking Duk feat. Elliphant - 'Stranger')
 2018 APRA Most Played Australian Work (Peking Duk - ’Stranger’)
 2018 APRA Dance Release of The Year (Peking Duk - ’Stranger’)

Discography

Production / Co-Writes / Vocals / Remixes

'96 Bulls Remixes

References 

APRA Award winners
Australian record producers
Living people
Year of birth missing (living people)